Kerar may refer to:
Karrar, Kurdamir, Azerbaijan
Krar, a musical instrument